Anthony is a Raj comics character. The character and the plot is inspired from The Crow created by James O'Barr.

Origin
Anthony was a great singer and his album "Crow Sangeet" (Crow Music) became very popular all over the world. He was murdered by jealousy and later resurrected by nature itself.
Now he is undead and as long as his soul is out of his body, his corpse lies motionless. Though several times his corpse was possessed by numerous enemies including Count Dracula.

Plot summary
The late Anthony Gonsalvez, a young music enthusiast, composed an original album entitled "Crow Music." This album became very popular, much to the dismay of his competitors. He was tortured to death by his rivals. He is fondly remembered by his wife Julia and daughter Maria and his pet crow Prince still sits on his tombstone to mourn his death.

Whenever innocent people are subjected to injustice, Prince cries out, loud and shrill, in the graveyard. The air trembles, the clouds thunder, lightning flashes, and the dead man Anthony rises out of his grave to render the justice.

Powers and Abilities
Anthony can make use of cold fire, also called as hellfire, as a  lethal weapon against his enemies. Though he cannot be hurt in any possible human way, after his death he became hydrophobic. On his 2nd resurrection, this limit of his was removed. Anthony regenerates each time after he kills his enemy, and until then his corpse remains mutilated.
He has superhuman strength as of Shakti, Nagraj and other superhumans of the Raj Comics Universe. Psychic powers like telepathy do not affect him at all. He can teleport at any place on his wish.

Family, Friends, and Allies
 Julie (Wife)
 Maria (Daughter)
 Prince Crow
 Inspector/DCP Itihaas
 Venu AKA Saza
 John (Maria's Husband)

Enemies
 Bhanja
 Bhairav Nath
 Prof. Jaandaal
 khuler baba
 Gajanan 
 baban
 lashkhor
 Obo
 pisaach 
 Jeevan data
 koyla
 kala doctor
 Murda supari
 Kaga
 Dr Bharati
 Yamraj
 Justice kaal
 Death stone
 Vulture gang
 operator
 Deadly
 Dyne 
 Dozer gang

Titles

Raj Comics has published a huge number of titles centered on Anthony. A list can be viewed at
 Titles  by Raj Comics

Discussion forum
Raj Comics hosts a discussion forum, with a section specially devoted to Anthony.
 Forum by Raj Comics

References

Indian comics
Raj Comics superheroes
Fictional undead
Fantasy comics
Dark fantasy comics
Crime comics
Superhero comics
Drama comics
Gothic comics